The USSSA Pride are a professional softball team based in Viera, Florida and a member of the WPF - Women's Professional Fastpitch League, U.S. Founded in 2009. They previously played in National Pro Fastpitch (NPF) from 2009 to 2019. They play their home games at USSSA Space Coast Complex.

The team was established to replace the folded Washington Glory, who played in NPF from 2007 to 2008. They are organized by the United States Specialty Sports Association (USSSA). The Pride won the Cowles Cup championship in 2010, 2013, 2014, 2018 and 2019.

History

2015
Of their selections in the 2015 NPF Draft, the Pride signed All-American and 2013 Big 12 Player of the Year Shelby Pendley of Oklahoma, two-time All-American and Atlantic Coast Conference (ACC) Player of the Year Emilee Koerner of Notre Dame, and  All-American and 2012 Pac-12 Player of the Year Amber Freeman of Arizona State. All-time NCAA Division I homerun champion Lauren Chamberlain signed a three-year deal.

The Pride also signed free agent  All-American Chelsea Goodacre of Arizona.

Caitlin Lowe announced her retirement as a player after the 2014 season.  Subsequently, the Pride announced that Lowe would be inducted into the USSSA Hall of Fame, and that her jersey number 26 would be retired.

2016

2017
The Pride announced that former player and assistant coach Megan Willis was promoted to assistant general manager.

USSSA purchased Space Coast Stadium and announced renovations to make it a center for amateur softball and baseball with 15 fields.  It became the Pride's new home stadium, beginning in 2017.

At the Pride's first home game at USSSA Space Coast Stadium, played on June 8, 2017, the team announced that it had retired legendary pitcher Cat Osterman's jersey number "8," commemorating it with a banner on the outfield fence.

2018
The Pride announced the Mike Stith, head coach of the OC BatBusters, would be their coach for 2018.  His assistants were Cody Dent, volunteer assistant coach of the Florida Gators softball team, and Andrea Duran, Olympic medalist and former Pride player.

2019
On September 13, 2019, the Pride announced they would not renew their partnership with National Pro Fastpitch (NPF) for the 2020 season.

2021
On September 30, 2021, the Pride announced they are joining the WPF - Women's Professional Fastpitch league for the 2022 season.

General managers
 Don DeDonatis (-present)

All-time head coaches

Season-by-season 

|-
|align=center|2009 || 16 || 24 || 0 || 4th place National Pro Fastpitch || Lost in NPF Semifinals 
|-
|align=center|2010 || 28 || 20 || 0 || 2nd place National Pro Fastpitch || Won NPF Championship
|-
|align=center|2011 || 30 || 9 || 0 || 1st place National Pro Fastpitch || Lost in NPF Finals
|-
|align=center|2012 || 31 || 12 || 0 || 1st place National Pro Fastpitch || Faced Chicago Bandits in NPF Finals
|-
|align=center|2013 || 34 || 14 || 0 || 2nd place National Pro Fastpitch || Won NPF Championship
|-
|align=center|2014 || 33 || 15 || 0 || 1st place National Pro Fastpitch || Won NPF Championship
|-
|align=center|2015 || 34 || 14 || 0 || 1st place National Pro Fastpitch || Lost to Chicago Bandits in NPF Finals
|-
|align=center|2016 || 37 || 13 || 0 || 1st place National Pro Fastpitch || Lost to Chicago Bandits in NPF Finals
|-
|align=center|2017 || 40 || 9 || 0 || 1st place National Pro Fastpitch || Lost to Scrap Yard Dawgs in NPF Finals
|-
|align=center|2018 || 42 || 5 || 0 || 1st place National Pro Fastpitch || Won NPF Championship
|-
|align=center|2019 || 32 || 13 || 0 || 2nd place National Pro Fastpitch || Won NPF Championship
|-
!Totals || 357 || 148 || 0
|colspan="2"|

Retired numbers
The Pride has retired two jerseys:
Cat Osterman 8
Caitlin Lowe 26

Current players

References

External links
Official Site

  
 

  
 

  
 

  
 

 
Softball teams
National Pro Fastpitch teams
Sports in Kissimmee, Florida
2009 establishments in Florida
Sports clubs established in 2009